The 1978–79 Divizia B was the 39th season of the second tier of the Romanian football league system.

The format has been maintained to three series, each of them having 18 teams. At the end of the season the winners of the series promoted to Divizia A and the last four places from each series relegated to Divizia C.

Team changes

To Divizia B
Promoted from Divizia C
 Minerul Gura Humorului
 Constructorul Iași
 Progresul Brăila
 Chimia Brazi
 SN Oltenița
 Viitorul Scornicești
 Drobeta-Turnu Severin
 Minerul Anina
 Înfrățirea Oradea
 Minerul Cavnic
 Poiana Câmpina
 IS Câmpia Turzii

Relegated from Divizia A
 FC Constanța
 Petrolul Ploiești
 FCM Reșița

From Divizia B
Relegated to Divizia C
 CFR Pașcani
 Celuloza Călărași
 Minerul Lupeni
 CSU Galați
 Carpați Sinaia
 Armătura Zalău
 CS Botoșani
 Pandurii Târgu Jiu
 Victoria Carei
 Relonul Săvinești
 Prahova Ploiești
 Avântul Reghin

Promoted to Divizia A
 Gloria Buzău
 Chimia Râmnicu Vâlcea
 Baia Mare

Renamed teams
Progresul București was renamed as Progresul Vulcan București.

Unirea Alexandria was renamed as Rulmentul Alexandria.

Other teams
Ceahlăul Piatra Neamț and Relonul Săvinești merged, the second one being absorbed by the first one. After the merge, Ceahlăul was renamed as Relon Ceahlăul Piatra Neamț.

League tables

Serie I

Serie II

Serie III

See also 
 1978–79 Divizia A
 1978–79 Divizia C
 1978–79 County Championship

References

Liga II seasons
Romania
2